Lophocorona flavicosta is a species of moth of the family Lophocoronidae. It was described by Nielsen and Kristensen in 1996, and is endemic to Western Australia.

References

Moths described in 1996
Moths of Australia
Endemic fauna of Australia
Arthropods of Western Australia
Lophocoronoidea
Taxa named by Ebbe Nielsen